Xiamen International School (XIS) is a private, international school in Xiamen, China. It was the first international school to be established in Fujian Province by the Chinese Ministry of Education.

History 
Xiamen International School (XIS) opened its doors in August 1997. It is located in Fujian Province on China's southern coast. The Ministry of Education approved XIS as the first international school in Fujian Province to accept expatriate students.

In June 2002, XIS relocated to its current campus. The 30,000-square-meter facility includes a gymnasium, a soccer field, a running track, three basketball courts, and an indoor swimming pool. There is a library, science labs, information technology labs, and a large cafeteria that can accommodate all students and faculty.

Academics

XIS provides academic programs based on the International Baccalaureate curriculum from pre-kindergarten to high school. XIS currently has approximately 550 students. XIS is accredited by the Western Association of Schools and Colleges (WASC).

XIS is a member of the Association of China and Mongolia International Schools (ACAMIS). XIS students actively participate in ACAMIS-organized events. On numerous occasions, these allow students to compete against students from other schools throughout China.

Elementary school program 
XIS strictly implements the framework of the International Baccalaureate Primary Years Program (IB-PYP). THE IB-PYP include academic instructions in English, Mathematics, Science and Social Studies. In addition, students are able to visit specialized classrooms to learn Art, Music, Physical Education and Information Technology. Students at XIS are offered a chance to learn a second language: either Mandarin or Korean.

Middle school program 
XIS Middle School offers the International Baccalaureate Middle Years Program (IBMYP). The MYP is a course of study designed to meet the education needs of students ages 11–16 years. XIS was authorized to offer the MYP in 2004. In addition to the core subjects — English, Mathematics, Science and Humanities — all students attend classes in Art, IT, Physical Education, and a second language — , Mandarin or ESOL (English for speakers of other languages). Music is available for all grades.

References

External links

 Xiamen International School

Education in Xiamen
International schools in China
Private schools in China
Buildings and structures in Xiamen
Educational institutions established in 1997
International Baccalaureate schools in China
Schools in Fujian
1997 establishments in China